Ida Marie Løvlien (born 7 February 1974) is a Norwegian politician for the Centre Party.

She served as a deputy representative to the Norwegian Parliament from Hedmark during the term 1997–2001. In total she met during 49 days of parliamentary session.

References

Deputy members of the Storting
Centre Party (Norway) politicians
Hedmark politicians
1974 births
Living people
Place of birth missing (living people)
21st-century Norwegian women politicians
21st-century Norwegian politicians
Women members of the Storting